Național 24 Plus is a Romanian free-to-air channel, owned by Centrul Național Media, which is a trust owned by Micula Brothers.

Until January 7, 2010, it was named as N24 and it was a 24-hour news channel. It was named as N24 Plus from January 7, 2010 until October 1, 2011, when it became Național 24 Plus. The idents of Național 24 Plus are identic with the idents of Național TV used from 2003 to 2004.

Național 24 Plus broadcasts Indian television series, news, documentaries, music videos, children's television programs and lifestyle television programs. It is the sister channel of Național TV, a generalist television channel, also owned by Centrul Național Media.

Programming

Indian series
Sasural Simar Ka
Saath Nibhaana Saathiya
Uttaran

Other programming
Știri
Sport
Meteo
Un nou mod de viață
Actul 2
Doza de Frumusețe și Stil
Euroferma
Sed Lex
Baronii
Vouă
Biography of America
American Cinema
Framework for Democracy
Istoria petrolului din România
Profesii, cariere
Videoclipuri Național FM

References

External links
Official Site

Television stations in Romania
Television channels and stations established in 2004